Pictou County Transit is a Canadian public transport system comprising one bus route in Pictou County, Nova Scotia, which serves the towns of New Glasgow and Stellarton.

History
In early 2020, the provincial government announced an investment of $200,000 toward the establishment of a three-year public transit pilot project serving Stellarton and New Glasgow.

The service launched on 17 May 2021.

The bus route was adjusted in September 2022.

References

External links
 

2021 establishments in Nova Scotia
Bus transport in Nova Scotia
Transit agencies in Nova Scotia